The Sea Eagle is a 1944 novel by Australian war correspondent and novelist James Aldridge.

Plot

Set in Axis-occupied Greece and Crete after the Nazi invasion during World War II, it follows the attempts of two Australian soldiers to make passage to Cairo with the help of Greek partisans.

Reception
Winner of the John Llewellyn Rhys Prize in 1945 and hailed as "the finest work of fiction yet produced by the war" (G.W. Bishop in the London Daily Telegraph), it has since fallen into obscurity. His first novel, Signed With Their Honour (1942), was also set in war-time Greece.

1944 Australian novels
Novels set in Greece during World War II
John Llewellyn Rhys Prize-winning works
Novels by James Aldridge
Little, Brown and Company books
Novels set in Crete